Ann Diamond (c.1831–22 April 1881) was a New Zealand hotel-keeper, storekeeper and midwife. She was born in Adare, County Limerick, Ireland on c.1831.

References

1830s births
1881 deaths
New Zealand midwives
Irish emigrants to New Zealand (before 1923)
New Zealand hoteliers
19th-century New Zealand businesspeople
19th-century New Zealand businesswomen